The men's snowboard cross competition of the 2013 Winter Universiade was held at Monte Bondone, Italy between December 11–12, 2013.

The seeding round was completed on December 11, while the elimination round was completed on December 12.

Medalists

Results

Qualification

Elimination round

1/8 finals

Heat 1

Heat 2

Heat 3

Heat 4

Heat 5

Heat 6

Heat 7

Heat 8

Quarterfinals

Heat 1

Heat 2

Heat 3

Heat 4

Semifinals

Heat 1

Heat 2

Finals

Small Finals

Big Finals

External links
Official results at the universiadetrentino.org.

Snowboarding at the 2013 Winter Universiade